This is a list of lakes of Ontario beginning with the letter F.

Fa
Faber Lake
Factor Lake (Rainy River District)
Factor Lake (Algoma District)
Fade Lake
Fagan Lake
Fagan Ponds
Fahey Lake
Fair Lake (Parry Sound District)
Fair Lake (Peterborough County)
Fair Lake (Rainy River District)
Fairbairn Lake (Thunder Bay District)
Fairbairn Lake (Sudbury District)
Fairbank Lake
Fairchild Lake
Faircloth Lake
Fairholme Lake
Fairloch Lake
Fairplay Lake
Fairview Lake
Fairy Lake (Georgian Bay)
Fairy Lake (Nipissing District)
Fairy Lake (Algoma District)
Fairy Lake (Huntsville)
Fairy Lake (Peterborough County)
Fairy Lake (Halton Region)
Faith Lake
Fakeloo Lake
Falan Lake
Falby Lake
Falcon Gold Lake
Falcon Lake (Nipissing District)
Falcon Lake (Thunder Bay District)
Fall Lake (Nipissing District)
Fall Lake (GTP Block 4 Township, Thunder Bay District)
Fall Lake (Dorion)
Fall Lake (Kenora District)
Fall-In Lake
Fallduck Lakes
Fallen Lake
Fallingsnow Lake
Fallis Pond
Falloon Lake
Falls Lake (Algoma District)
Falls Lake (Manitoulin District)
Fallscamp Lake
False Lake
Falsetto Lake
Fan Lake (Thunder Bay District)
Fan Lake (Timiskaming District)
Fanny Lake
Fanshawe Lake
Far Lake (Sudbury District)
Far Lake (Thunder Bay District)
Faraday Lake
Farah Lake
Farden Lake
Farewell Lake
Fargo Lake
Faries Lake
Faris Lake
Farlain Lake
Farlane Lake
Farlette Lake
Farley Lake
Farlinger Lake
Farm Bay Lake
Farm Lake (Sudbury District)
Farm Lake (Farm Creek, Kenora District)
Farm Lake (Greater Sudbury)
Farm Lake (Nipissing District)
Farm Lake (Lac Seul, Kenora District)
Farmer Lake (Sudbury District)
Farmer Lake (Kenora District)
Farmer Lake (Thunder Bay District)
Farncomb Lake
Farner Lake
Farnes Lake
Farquhar Lake (Haliburton County)
Farquhar Lake (Algoma District)
Farrel Lake (Haliburton County)
Farrel Lake (Algoma District)
Farrell Lake
Farren Lake
Farrer Lake (Thunder Bay District)
Farrer Lake (Kenora District)
Farrington Lake
Farrow Lake
Fassett Lake
Fat Lake (Kenora District)
Fat Lake (Nipissing District)
Fatima Lake
Fatty Lake
Faubert Lake
Faulk Lake
Faulkenham Lake
Faulkner Lake
Fault Lake (Timiskaming District)
Fault Lake (Sudbury District)
Fault Lake (Kenora District)
Faultside Lake
Fauquier Lake (Nipissing District)
Fauquier Lake (Rainy River District)
Favel Lake
Favell Lake (Cochrane District)
Favell Lake (Kenora District)
Favot Lake
Favourable Lake
Fawcett Lake (Sudbury District)
Fawcett Lake (Pelican Creek, Kenora District)
Fawcett Lake (Cat River, Kenora District)
Fawcett Lake Chain
Fawn Lake (Thunder Bay District)
Fawn Lake (Sioux Narrows-Nestor Falls)
Fawn Lake (Macaulay Township, Bracebridge)
Fawn Lake (Fawn River, Kenora District)
Fawn Lake (Nipissing District)
Fawn Lake (Draper Township, Bracebridge)
Fawn Lake (Parry Sound District)
Fawn Lake (Miller Township, North Frontenac)
Fawn Lake (Clarendon Township, North Frontenac)
Fawthrop Lake
Faya Lake

Fe
Feagan Lake
Fear Lake
Fearless Lake
Feather Lake
Feaver Lake
Fecteau Lake
Fee Lake
Feely Lake
Feeny Lake
Feist Lake
Felcite Lake
Feldman Lake (Kenora District)
Feldman Lake (Cochrane District)
Feldman Lake (Timiskaming District)
Feline Lake
Felix Lake (Thunder Bay District)
Felix Lake (Kenora District)
Felix Lake (Potier Township, Sudbury District)
Felix Lake (Marshay Township, Sudbury District)
Felsen Lake
Felsia Lake
Felst Lake
Felt Lake
Felto Lake
Fen Lake (Nipissing District)
Fen Lake (Sudbury District)
Fen Lake (Kenora District)
Fen Lake (Thunder Bay District)
Fenn Lake
Fennah Lake
Fennell Lake
Fenson Lake
Fenton Lake (Algoma District)
Fenton Lake (Muskoka District)
Ferdinand Lake
Fergus Lake (Sudbury District)
Fergus Lake (Cochrane District)
Ferguson Lake (Thunder Bay District)
Ferguson Lake (Stewart Township, Nipissing District)
Ferguson Lake (Timiskaming District)
Ferguson Lake (Kenora District)
Ferguson Lake (Rainy River District)
Ferguson Lake (Sudbury District)
Ferguson Lake (Lanark County)
Ferguson Lake (Temagami)
Fergusons Lake
Fergusons Mud Lake
Ferland's Lake
Fermoy Lake
Fern Lake (Whitman Township, Algoma District)
Fern Lake (Quill Township, Algoma District)
Fern Lake (Nipissing District)
Fern Lake (Rainy River District)
Fernlund Lake
Fernow Lake
Ferns Lake
Ferrier Lake
Ferrim Lake
Ferris Lake
Festuca Lake
Fetter Lake

Fi
Fib Lake
Ficht Lake
Fiddler Lake
Fidler Lake
Fido Lake
Fields Lake
Fife Lake (Thunder Bay District)
Fife Lake (Sudbury District)
Fife Lake (Algoma District)
Fifteen Lake
Fifteen Mile Lake (Parry Sound District)
Fifteen Mile Lake (Muskoka District)
Fifteen Mile Pond
Fifth Depot Lake
Fifth Lake
Fifty Dollar Lake
Fifty Nine Lake
Fifty Two Lake
Fifty-five Mile Lake
Fillet Lake
Fillion Lake
Fills Lake
Film Lake
Filter Lake
Fin Lake (White Township, Nipissing District)
Fin Lake (Thunder Bay District)
Fin Lake (Canisbay Township, Nipissing District)
Final Lake (Kenora District)
Final Lake (Thunder Bay District)
Finch Lake (Nipissing District)
Finch Lake (Lennox and Addington County)
Findlay Lake (Cochrane District)
Findlay Lake (Kenora District)
Findlay Lake (Renfrew County)
Fine Lake
Finger Lake (Cochrane District)
Finger Lake (Severn River, Kenora District)
Finger Lake (Corbriere Township, Algoma District)
Finger Lake (Ferdinand Lake, Kenora District)
Finger Lake (Parry Sound District)
Finger Lake (Nipissing District)
Finger Lake (Tweedle Township, Algoma District)
Finger Lake (Rainy River District)
Finger Lake (Thunder Bay District)
Finish Lake
Fink Lake
Finlay Lake
Finlayson Lake (Nipissing District)
Finlayson Lake (Kenora District)
Finlayson Lake (Rainy River District)
Finlayson Lake (Thunder Bay District)
Finn Lake (Simons Township, Algoma District)
Finn Lake (Aweres Township, Algoma District)
Finn Lake (McMeekin Township, Kenora District)
Finn Lake (McCauley River, Kenora District)
Finn Lake (Nadjiwon Township, Algoma District)
Finnegan Lake
Finney Lake
Finton Lake
Fir Lake (Kenora District)
Fir Lake (Algoma District)
Fire Hill Lake
Fire Island Lake
Fire Lake (Aberdeen Creek, Thunder Bay District)
Fire Lake (Rainy River District)
Fire Lake (Kenora District)
Fire Lake (Sudbury District)
Fire Lake (Algoma District)
Fire Lake (Weikwabinonaw River, Thunder Bay District)
Firefly Lake
Fireline Lake
Firetrail Lake
First Depot Lake
First Egan Lake
First Government Lake
First James Lake
First Justin Lake
First Kargus Lake
First Lake (Gravel River, Thunder Bay District)
First Lake (Hall Township, Sudbury District)
First Lake (Western Peninsula, Kenora District)
First Lake (Lone Isle Creek, Thunder Bay District)
First Lake (Cavana Township, Sudbury District)
First Lake (Elliot Lake)
First Lake (Seguin)
First Lake (Labelle Township, Algoma District)
First Lake (Selkirk Township, Sudbury District)
First Lake (Cromlech Township, Algoma District)
First Lake (Big Sand Lake, Kenora District)
First Lake (Nipissing)
First Loon Lake
First Twin Pond
Firth Lake
Fischer Lake
Fish Hawk Lake (Sudbury District)
Fish Hawk Lake (Kenora District)
Fish Hook Lake
Fish Lake (Parry Sound District)
Fish Lake (Kenora District)
Fish Lake (Prince Edward County)
Fish Lake (Algoma District)
Fish Lake (Nairn and Hyman)
Fish Lake (Frontenac County)
Fish Lake (Lyell Township, South Algonquin)
Fish Lake (Killarney)
Fish Lake (Dickens Township, South Algonquin)
Fishbasket Lake
Fishbox Lake
Fisher Lake (Kashaweogama Lake, Thunder Bay District)
Fisher Lake (Populus Lake, Kenora District)
Fisher Lake (Wilkie Lake, Kenora District))
Fisher Lake (Haliburton County)
Fisher Lake (McNamara Township, Sudbury District)
Fisher Lake (Golden Gate Lake, Thunder Bay District)
Fisher Lake (Redsky Township, Algoma District))
Fisher Lake (Sweeny Township, Sudbury District)
Fisher Lake (Timiskaming District)
Fisher Lake (McConnell Township, Sudbury District)
Fisher Lake (Cochrane District)
Fisher Lake (Kawartha Lakes)
Fisher Lake (Rainy River District)
Fisher Lake (Arnott Township, Algoma District)
Fisher Lake (Nipissing District)
Fisher's Pond
Fishery Lake
Fishing Lake
Fishnet Lake
Fishog Lake
Fishtail Lake
Fishtrap Lake (Attawapiskat River, Kenora District)
Fishtrap Lake (Fishtrap Creek, Kenora District)
Fission Lake
Fitchie Lake
Fitter Lake
Fitz Lake
Fitzell Lake
Fitzgerald Lake
Fitzgibbon Lake
Fitzpatrick Lake (Escape Lake, Thunder Bay District)
Fitzpatrick Lake (Kenogamisis River, Thunder Bay District)
Fitzpatrick Lake (Algoma District)
Five Cross Lake
Five Mile Lake (Sudbury District)
Five Mile Lake (Rainy River District)
Five Minute Lake
Five Pines Lake
Five Star Lake
Fiveash Lake
Fizell Lake

Fl
Flack Lake
Flag Lake (Timiskaming District)
Flag Lake (Elliot Lake)
Flag Lake (Worton Township, Algoma District)
Flag Lake (Thunder Bay District)
Flagg Lake
Flail Lake
Flake Lake
Flambeau Lake
Flame Lake (Sudbury District)
Flame Lake (Kenora District)
Flamingo Lake (Algoma District)
Flamingo Lake (Cochrane District)
Flanagan Lake
Flanders Lake
Flange Lake
Flannery Lake
Flapjack Lake (Kenora District)
Flapjack Lake (Nipissing District)
Flash Lake
Flat Iron Lake
Flat Lake (Timiskaming District)
Flat Lake (Kenora District)
Flat Lake (Thunder Bay District)
Flat Lake (Algoma District)
Flatrock Lake (Thunder Bay District)
Flatrock Lake (Muskoka District)
Flats Lake
Flatstone Lake
Flatt Lake
Flavelle Lake
Flavour Lake
Flaxman Lake
Fleck Lake
Fleet Lake
Flegg Lake
Fleming Lake (Thunder Bay District)
Fleming Lake (Cochrane District)
Fleming Lake (Lake of Bays)
Fleming Lake (Huntsville)
Flemings Lake
Flesch Lake
Flesher Lake
Flesherton Community Pond
Flet Lake
Fletcher Lake (Haliburton County)
Fletcher Lake (Thunder Bay District)
Fletcher Lake (Kenora District)
Fletcher Lake (Algoma District)
Fletchers Lake
Flett Lake
Flew Lake
Flex Lake
Flicker Lake (Sudbury District)
Flicker Lake (Thunder Bay District)
Flindt Lake
Flint Lake (Kenora District)
Flint Lake (Thunder Bay District)
Flint Lake (Algoma District)
Float Lake
Floating Heart Lake (Nipissing District)
Floating Heart Lake (Thunder Bay District)
Floating Island Lake
Floating Rock Lake
Flood Lake (Cochrane District)
Flood Lake (Terrace Bay)
Flood Lake (Flood Township, Thunder Bay District)
Flood Lake (Rainy River District)
Floodwood Lake
Flora Lake (Rainy River District)
Flora Lake (Kenora District)
Floranna Lake
Florence Lake (Haliburton County)
Florence Lake (Kenora District)
Florence Lake (Thunder Bay District)
Florence Lake (Nipissing District)
Florence Lake (Parker Township, Sudbury District)
Florence Lake (Cochrane District)
Florence Lake (Mongowin Township, Sudbury District)
Florence Lake (De Gaulle Township, Sudbury District)
Florence Lake (Huotari Township, Algoma District)
Florence Lake (Grossman Township, Algoma District)
Florin Lake (Cochrane District)
Florin Lake (Kenora District)
Flory Lake
Floss Lake
Flossie Lake (Kenora District)
Flossie Lake (Muskoka District)
Flossie Lake (Thunder Bay District)
Flounder Lake
Flower Lake (Thunder Bay District)
Flower Lake (Kenora District)
Flower Round Lake
Floyd Lake
Fluke Lake
Fluker Lake
Flundra Lake
Flute Lake
Fly Lake (Muskoka District)
Fly Lake (Kenora District)
Fly Lake (Cochrane District)
Fly Lake (Nipissing District)
Fly Lake (McLeod Township, Sudbury District)
Fly Lake (Thunder Bay District)
Fly Lake (Whitefish Lake 6)
Fly Lake (Algoma District)
Flying Fisher Lake
Flying Goose Lake
Flying Loon Lake
Flyline Lake
Flynn Lake
Flynne Lake

Fo
Foam Lake (East Jackpine River, Thunder Bay District)
Foam Lake (Algoma District)
Foam Lake (Furlonge Township, Thunder Bay District)
Foch Lake
Fodder Lake
Fog Lake (Rainy River District)
Fog Lake (Fog Creek, Thunder Bay District)
Fog Lake (Kenora District)
Fog Lake (Cockeram Township, Thunder Bay District)
Fog Lake (Manion Township, Thunder Bay District)
Fog Lake (Nipissing District)
Fogal Lake
Fogerty Lake
Fogg Lake
Foisey Lake
Fold Lake
Foley Lake (Ball Township, Kenora District)
Foley Lake (Yet Creek, Kenora District)
Foley Lake (Renfrew County)
Foley Lake (Nipissing District)
Foley Lake (Sudbury District)
Folkard Lake
Folly Lake
Folsom Lake
Folson Lake
Fool Lake
Foolem Lake
Fools Lake
Foot Lake (Behmann Township, Algoma District)
Foot Lake (Sudbury District)
Foot Lake (Thunder Bay District)
Foot Lake (Timiskaming District)
Foot Lake (Huron Shores)
Foot Lake (Kenora District)
Foot Lake (Cochrane District)
Foote Lake (Nipissing District)
Foote Lake (Parry Sound District)
Foote Lake (Thunder Bay District)
Footprint Lake (Rainy River District)
Footprint Lake (Algoma District)
Footprint Lake (Cochrane District)
Footprint Lakes
Forbes Lake (Nipissing District)
Forbes Lake (Cochrane District)
Forbes Lake (Parry Sound District)
Forbes Lake (Thunder Bay District)
Forbes Lake (Kenora District)
Ford Lake (Ontario–Manitoba)
Ford Lake (Parry Sound District)
Ford Lake (Cochrane District)
Ford Lake (Sudbury District)
Ford Lake (Algoma District)
Ford Lake (Osaquan Township, Kenora District)
Forde Lake
Fore Lake
Forearm Lake
Foref Lake
Foreman Lake (Kenora District)
Foreman Lake (Muskoka District)
Foreshew Lake
Forest Lake (Smellie Township, Kenora District)
Forest Lake (Wind Creek, Kenora District)
Forest Lake (Sudbury District)
Forest Lake (Parry Sound District)
Forestell Lake
Forester Lake (Kenora District)
Forester Lake (Algoma District)
Forgan Lake
Forge Lake (Thunder Bay District)
Forge Lake (Algoma District)
Forget Lake (Thunder Bay District)
Forget Lake (Parry Sound District)
Forgotten Lake
Foris Lake
Fork Lake (Timiskaming District)
Fork Lake (Kenora District)
Fork Lake (Hastings County)
Fork Lake (Sudbury District)
Fork Lake (Sproule Township, Nipissing District)
Fork Lake (Boyd Township, Nipissing District)
Fork Lake (Algoma District)
Fork Lake (Thunder Bay District)
Forks Lake
Forlise Lake
Forlorn Lake
Forrest Lake
Forrester Lake
Forron Lake
Forsberg Lake
Forsyth Lake (Timiskaming District)
Forsyth Lake (Thunder Bay District)
Forsythe Lake
Fortes Lake
Fortescue Lake
Forth Lake
Fortune Lake (Frontenac County)
Fortune Lake (Timiskaming District)
Fortune Lake (Thunder Bay District)
Fortune Lake (Kenora District)
Fortune Lake (Sudbury District)
Fortune Lake (Cochrane District)
Forty Four Lake
Forty Mile Lake
Foss Lake
Foster Lake (Sudbury District)
Foster Lake (Greater Sudbury)
Foster Lake (Thunder Bay District)
Foster Lake (Hastings County)
Foster Lake (Kenora District)
Foster Lake (Algoma District)
Foster Ponds
Fosters Lake
Fotheringham Lake
Found Lake (Thunder Bay District)
Found Lake (Kenora District)
Found Lake (Nipissing District)
Found Lake (Algoma District)
Founders Lake
Fountain Lake
Four Corner Lake
Four Island Lake
Four Line Lake
Four Mile Lake (Kawartha Lakes)
Four Mile Lake (Kenora District)
Four Mile Lake (Sudbury District)
Four Mile Lake (Nipissing District)
Four Mile Pond
Four Wells Lake
Fourbass Lake
Fourbay Lake (Fourbay Creek, Thunder Bay District)
Fourbay Lake (Sturgeon River, Thunder Bay District)
Fourclaim Lake
Fourcorner Lake
Fournier Lake (Rainy River District)
Fournier Lake (Cochrane District)
Fournier Lake (Algoma District)
Fournier Lake (Thunder Bay District)
Fournier Lake (Nipissing District)
Fournier Lake (Timiskaming District)
Fourstar Lake
Fourteen Island Lake
Fourteen Lake
Fourth Depot Lake
Fourth Lake (Thunder Bay District)
Fourth Lake (Kenora District)
Fourth Lake (Sudbury District)
Fowler Lake (Thunder Bay District)
Fowler Lake (Cochrane District)
Fowler Lake (Muskoka District)
Fowlers Pond
Fowlkes Lakes
Fox Lagoon
Fox Lake (Sword Creek, Kenora District)
Fox Lake (Little Jet Lake, Kenora District)
Fox Lake (Frontenac County)
Fox Lake (Venturi Township, Sudbury District)
Fox Lake (Lennox and Addington County)
Fox Lake (Matachewan)
Fox Lake (Wilson Township, Parry Sound District)
Fox Lake (Fox River, Thunder Bay District)
Fox Lake (Kearney)
Fox Lake (Press Lake, Kenora District)
Fox Lake (Fox Creek, Thunder Bay District)
Fox Lake (Margaret Township, Sudbury District)
Fox Lake (Renfrew County)
Fox Lake (Boston Township, Timiskaming District)
Fox Lake (Cochrane District)
Fox Lake (Muskoka District)
Fox Lake (Ignace)
Fox Lake (Lake of the Woods, Kenora District)
Fox Lake (Algoma District)
Fox Lake (Goschen Township, Killarney)
Fox Lake (Fox Creek, Killarney)
Fox Lake (Mongowin Township, Sudbury District)
Fox Lake (Whitestone)
Foxear Lake
Foxhead Lake (Thunder Bay District)
Foxhead Lake (Kenora District)
Foxhead Lake (Timiskaming District)
Foxpaw Lake
Foxtail Lake
Foxtrap Lake
Foxxe Lake
Foy Lake (Cochrane District)
Foy Lake (Nipissing District)
Foy Lake (Foy Township, Sudbury District)
Foy Lake (Semple Township, Sudbury District)
Foyross Lake
Foys Lake (Nipissing District)
Foys Lake (Renfrew County)

Fr
Fra Lake
Fradin Lake
Frain Lake
Frair Lake
Fraleck Lake
Fraleck's Pond
Fraleigh Lake
Framan Lake
Frame Lake
Fran Lake (Algoma District)
Fran Lake (Rainy River District)
Frances Lake (Sudbury District)
Frances Lake (Nipissing District)
Frances Lake (Kenora District)
Frances Lake (Cochrane District)
Francesca Lake
Francille Lake
Francis Lake (Algoma District)
Francis Lake (Eldridge Township, Nipissing District)
Francis Lake (Kenora District)
Francis Lake (Grey County)
Francis Lake (Lennox and Addington County)
Francis Lake (Thunder Bay District)
Francis Lake (Edgar Township, Nipissing District)
Francis Lake (White Township, Nipissing District)
Francis Lake (Olrig Township, Nipissing District)
Franciscan Lake
Francklyn Lake
Frank Lake (Thunder Bay District)
Frank Lake (Sudbury District)
Frank Lake (Parry Sound District)
Frank Lake (Timiskaming District)
Frank Lake (Haliburton County)
Frank Ponds
Frank's Lake
Frankfurth Lake
Frankish Lake
Franklin Lake (Kenora District)
Franklin Lake (Rainy River District)
Franklin Lake (Algoma District)
Franklin Lake (Sudbury District)
Franklin Pond
Franks Lake (Sudbury District)
Franks Lake (Madawaska Valley)
Franks Lake (Algoma District)
Franks Lake (Greater Madawaska)
Franky Lake
Frantz Pond
François Lake
Frappier Lake (Thunder Bay District)
Frappier Lake (Sudbury District)
Fraser Lake (Frontenac County)
Fraser Lake (Haliburton County)
Fraser Lake (Sturgeon Lake, Thunder Bay District)
Fraser Lake (Renfrew County)
Fraser Lake (Haines Township, Thunder Bay District)
Fraser Lake (Parry Sound District)
Fraser Lake (Muskoka District)
Fraser Lake (Greater Sudbury)
Fraser Lake (Hastings County)
Fraser Lake (Algoma District)
Fraser Lake (Sudbury District)
Fraser Lake (Timiskaming District)
Frater Lake
Fraud Lake
Frawley Lake
Frawly Lake
Frazer Lake
Frazier Lake
Frechette Lake
Fred Lake (St. Ignace Island, Thunder Bay District)
Fred Lake (Timiskaming District)
Fred Lake (Rainy River District)
Fred Lake (Nickle Township, Thunder Bay District)
Fredart Lake
Freddie Lake
Frederick House Lake
Frederick Lake (Timiskaming District)
Frederick Lake (Sudbury District)
Frederickson Lake
Freds Lake
Free Lake
Freeborn Lake
Freed Lake
Freeland Lake
Freele Lake
Freeman Lake (Cochrane District)
Freeman Lake (Frontenac County)
Freeman Lake (Sudbury District)
Freen Lake
French Lake (Kenora District)
French Lake (Thunder Bay District)
French Lake (Rainy River District)
French Lake (Cochrane Disitrct)
Frenchman Lake
Frenchmans Lake
Frere Lake
Fresque Lake
Freure Lake
Freve Lake
Frey Lake (Parry Sound District)
Frey Lake (Sudbury District)
Freymond Lake
Fricker Lake
Friday Lake (Cochrane District)
Friday Lake (Nipissing District)
Friday Lake (Sudbury District)
Friday Lake (McEwing Township, Algoma District)
Friday Lake (Royal Township, Algoma District)
Friendly Lake (Broughton Township, Algoma District)
Friendly Lake (McIlveen Township, Algoma District)
Frigid Lake
Frill Lake
Frise Lake
Frith Lake (Thunder Bay District)
Frith Lake (Sudbury District)
Fritsch Lake
Fritz Lake
Froats Lake
Frobel Lake
Frog Lake (Creelman Township, Sudbury District)
Frog Lake (Coleman)
Frog Lake (Lincoln Township, Sudbury District)
Frog Lake (Ray Township, Timiskaming District)
Frog Lake (Frontenac County)
Frog Lake (Nipissing District)
Frog Lake (Thunder Bay District)
Frog Pond
Frogfly Lake
Froggy Lake (Thunder Bay District)
Froggy Lake (Nipissing District)
Frogharbour Lake
Frond Lake
Frontier Lake (Cochrane District)
Frontier Lake (Nipissing District)
Frood Lake
Froome Lake
Frost Lake (Sudbury District)
Frost Lake (Nebonaionquet Township, Algoma District)
Frost Lake (Frost Township, Algoma District)
Frost Lake (Haliburton County)
Frost Lake (Parry Sound District)
Froude Lake
Fry Lake (Kenora District)
Fry Lake (Sudbury District)
Fryer Lake
Frying Pan Lake (Thunder Bay District)
Frying Pan Lake (Algoma District)
Fryingpan Lake (Cochrane District)
Fryingpan Lake (Timiskaming District)
Frypan Lake

Fu–Fy
Fuchsite Lake
Fugere Lake
Fulcher Lake
Fulford Lake
Fuller Lake
Fullerton Lake (Algoma District)
Fullerton Lake (Thunder Bay District)
Fume Lake
Fummerton Lake
Funger Lake
Fungus Lake
Funnel Lake
Funnybone Lake
Funston Lake
Furcate Lake
Furlonge Lake
Furniss Lake
Furnival Lake
Furrow Lake
Furry Lake
Fushimi Lake
Futh Lake
Futile Lake
Fyfe Lake

References
 Geographical Names Data Base, Natural Resources Canada

F